Taghazout (Berber: ⵜⴰⵖⴰⵣⵓⵜ, Taɣazut; Arabic: تاغازوت) is a small fishing village  north of the city of Agadir in southwestern Morocco. The inhabitants are mostly of Berber origin. Fishing, tourism, and the production of Argan oil being the main source of income. In recent years, tourism has been increasing in importance to the local economy and it is a popular surfing destination.

Geography 
Taghazout is located on Morocco's Atlantic Ocean coastline, 19 km north of Agadir and 152 km south of Essaouira. Inland it is surrounded by the western foothills of the High Atlas.

Demography 
The inhabitants of earlier times were exclusively Berbers from the Ida Oufella tribe, but due to the increasing modernization (connection to the electricity, water and telephone network) and the associated construction boom in the surroundings of Agadir, many newcomers from other regions of Morocco have joined. Moroccan Arabic is the main language, but French and English are also spoken. The regional Berber dialect is still being used in the hinterland.

History 

Like almost all Berber villages in southern Morocco, virtually nothing is known about the earlier history of Taghazout; oral traditions only report of clashes of the united Berber tribes with the Portuguese in the 16th century. The Berber inhabitants originally resided in the foothills of the surrounding mountains and used the village purely as a place to store their fishing equipment.
As the Spanish increased their hold on the area in the 19th Century, factories and Mosques were built in order to house the Berber people and the village grew into a larger community.

In a similar fashion to Calangute beach in Goa India and Kuta on the island of Bali Indonesia, a beach just south of the village became famous in the late 1960s as a destination for young people to base themselves while exploring southern Morocco. On occasion, several hundred would reside in tents, makeshift buildings, and camper vans. However, the camp has been banned and instead replaced with fully equipped hotels and resorts for tourists.

Since 1992 Taghazout is the center of an independent municipality, which also includes several villages in the hinterland.

Tourism 

Tourism is an important source of income of locals. Though, they are worrying about the urbanization projects in process (Taghazout Bay). The Moroccan Minister of Tourism underlined the importance of the ecological and sustainable component adopted as part of the project, for the benefit of the local populations of Taghazout and Tamraght, through the construction of public facilities and of income generating activities and jobs.

The project is supposed to attract 300,000 more tourists in the current period (from 2015 to 2020).

In addition to its beaches and points that have quality surf for beginner, intermediate and expert surfers, Taghazout also attracts visitors looking for calm and tranquility away from more visited destinations such as Marrakech and Agadir. Taghazout also serves as a convenient base to do other activities such as day trips to Paradise Valley trip, visiting Argan oil factories, camel riding on the beach, yoga retreats, paddle boarding and kayaking.

Beaches

There are several beaches north of Agadir, which all offer a good alternative to the local beach in town. The setting of these beaches can be most attractive, with mountains on all sides, yet with a wide and clean beach with all necessary amenities. The largest and popular are: Tamawanza (12 km), Aitswal Beach, Imouran (17 km),Taghazout beach (19 km), Du lkhmiss 20, Bouyirdn (21 km), Timzguida allal (22 km), Imiouadar (27 km), Aghroud (30 km).

Surfing is now a common activity for visitors. Morocco is known for its long right-hand point breaks which are consistent and relatively uncrowded. The most famous of which, Anchor Point, is located 3km to the north of the village. In the right conditions this point can take you on a 2 km ride, starting at Anchor Point, joining up with Hash Point and ending on the beach break at Panorama's. There are several other beaches in and around the area making it an ideal destination for all levels of surfing skill. The waves work best between September to April especially for advanced surfers, receiving similar conditions to that of mainland Europe, but with the warm waters of the Moroccan Atlantic up to 21 degrees.

Taghazout Bay 
The site Taghazout-Argana Bay is 15 kilometres north of Agadir. It is intended to become the first seaside resort in Morocco, 300 km from Marrakesh, the first cultural and tourist centre of the country and 180 kilometres from the city of Essaouira.

Taghazout Bay is part of the Moroccan national tourism strategy ‘Vision 2030’. It is expected (September 2018) to provide the implementation of 8000 beds (5800 hotels), with closer and more environmentally friendly tourism development, "Taghazout eco-resort." It further provides for a village of surfers, a village green holiday, camping with international standards, a 17-hole golf course, cafes, restaurants, shops and galleries.

See also 
 Plan Azur
 Surfing in Morocco

References

External links

Populated places in Agadir-Ida Ou Tanane Prefecture
Rural communes of Souss-Massa
Fishing communities
Beaches of Morocco
Outdoor recreation